St Mary the Less, Norwich is a Grade I listed redundant church located on Queen Street, Norwich.

The church consists of a west tower, three-bay nave, chancel and south porch with parvise. It is built of flint with stone and brick dressings and dates from the 13th century. The church has been built up against on three sides so is not prominent in the street.

History

The church is medieval but became redundant in 1544 when its parish was absorbed by St George's, Tombland. The building was used as a hall where Dutch merchants sold cloth. In 1637 it was converted into a church for Walloon and French Protestants; pastors included John Bruckner and Joseph Nicol Scott. This use continued until 1832 when it was sold to the Swedenborgians. In 1869 it became a Catholic Apostolic Church. After closure in 1959 it became a furniture warehouse for Robertson & Coleman until 1985. In 1989 it was sold into private ownership by the Norwich French Church Charity.

It is on the Historic England Heritage at Risk Register, which says it is "currently used as an historical studies centre but not easily accessible. The building is thought to be in need of repair, especially the roof".

References

External links
Norwich French Church Charity 

Mary
Grade I listed churches in Norfolk